Wolf Trap is a proposed Washington Metro station in Fairfax County, Virginia, on the Silver Line between Wiehle-Reston East and Spring Hill. The station would be located in the central median of Virginia State Route 267 (Dulles Access Road) at the Trap Road overpass adjacent to the Wolf Trap National Park for the Performing Arts.

A stop at Wolf Trap had been considered as part of the Silver Line, however, it was deemed too costly with little development potential, and was thus excluded from the initial phases of the project, though provisions were to be made for future construction of the station.  Some of these provisions, such as the installation of an additional crossover, have been omitted from the project to reduce costs, however, the track at the Trap Road overpass has been spaced and graded so as to allow the future installation of a center platform.

References

External links 
 Dulles Corridor Metrorail Project

Stations on the Silver Line (Washington Metro)
Transportation in Fairfax County, Virginia
Washington Metro stations in Virginia
Proposed Washington Metro stations